Elections to the Assam Legislative Assembly were held on March 27, 1952. This election was officially known as the 1951 Assam Legislative Assembly election, even though through delays, actual voting didn't take place until early 1952.

Constituencies

Assam Legislative Assembly, 1952 consisted of 81 single-member constituencies and 13 double-member constituencies. A total of 590 nominations were filed out of which 61 were rejected and 74 withdrew their nominations. So a total of 455 candidates contested the first legislative assembly elections in Assam.

Political Parties

9 National parties along with 10 registered unrecognized parties took part in the assembly election. Indian National Congress contested 92 seats and won 76 of them. Independent candidates won 14 seats while no other party cross double-digit.

Results

|- style="background-color:#E9E9E9; text-align:center;"
! class="unsortable" |
! Political Party !! Flag !! Seats  Contested !! Won !! % of  Seats !! Votes !! Vote %
|- style="background: #90EE90;"
| 
| style="text-align:left;" |Indian National Congress
| 
| 92 || 76 || 72.38 || 10,64,850 || 43.48
|-
| 
| style="text-align:left;" |Socialist Party
|
| 61 || 4 || 3.81 || 3,25,690 || 13.30
|-
| 
| style="text-align:left;" |Kisan Mazdoor Praja Party
|
| 40 || 1 || 0.95 || 1,46,792 || 5.99
|-
| 
| style="text-align:left;" |Communist Party of India
| 
| 18 || 1 || 0.95 || 69,431 || 2.84
|-
|
| style="text-align:left;" |Garo National Council
|
| 4 || 3 || 2.86 || 14,577 || 0.60
|-
|
| style="text-align:left;" |Khasi-Jaintia Durbar
|
| 4 || 1 || 0.95 || 24,248 || 0.99
|-
|
| style="text-align:left;" |All People's Party (Assam)
|
| 3 || 1 || 0.95 || 14,930 || 0.61
|-
|
| style="text-align:left;" |Mizo Union
|
| 3 || 3 || 2.86 || 29,104 || 1.19
|-
|
| style="text-align:left;" |Khasi Jaintia Federated State National Conference
|
| 1 || 1 || 0.95 || 9,441 || 0.39
|-
| 
|
| 213 || 14 || 13.33 || 6,93,908 || 28.34
|- class="unsortable" style="background-color:#E9E9E9"
! colspan = 3| Total Seats
! 105 !! style="text-align:center;" |Voters !! 49,55,390 !! style="text-align:center;" |Turnout !! 24,48,890 (49.42%)
|}

Elected members

See also
 1951–52 elections in India
 1957 Assam Legislative Assembly election

References

Asssam
State Assembly elections in Assam
1950s in Assam
March 1952 events in Asia